Los Cerros de Paja is a corregimiento in Los Pozos District, Herrera Province, Panama with a population of 896 as of 2010. Its population as of 1990 was 1,075; its population as of 2000 was 877.

References

Corregimientos of Herrera Province